This is a list of the most influential long-lived, well-mixed greenhouse gases, along with their tropospheric concentrations and direct radiative forcings, as identified by the Intergovernmental Panel on Climate Change (IPCC).   Abundances of these trace gases are regularly measured by atmospheric scientists from samples collected throughout the world.  Since the 1980s, their forcing contributions (relative to year 1750) are also estimated with high accuracy using IPCC-recommended expressions derived from radiative transfer models.

This list excludes:
 water vapor which is responsible overall for about half of all atmospheric gas forcing.  Water vapor and clouds are more dynamic atmospheric constituents and contribute strong climate change feedback influences.
 other short-lived gases (e.g. carbon monoxide, NOx) and aerosols (e.g. mineral dust, black carbon) that also vary more strongly over location and time.  Ozone has warming influences comparable to nitrous oxide and CFCs,  and is longer lived and more abundant in the stratosphere than in the troposphere. 
 many refrigerants and other halogenated gases that have been mass-produced in smaller quantities. Most are long-lived and well-mixed.  Some are also listed in Appendix 8A of the 2013 IPCC Assessment Report. and Annex III of the 2021 IPCC WG1 Report
 oxygen, nitrogen, argon, and other gases that are less influenced by human activity and interact relatively little with Earth's thermal radiation.

Combined Summary from IPCC Assessment Reports (TAR, AR4, AR5, AR6) 

Mole fractions: μmol/mol = ppm = parts per million (106); nmol/mol = ppb = parts per billion (109); pmol/mol = ppt = parts per trillion (1012). The IPCC states that "no single atmospheric lifetime can be given" for CO2.  This is mostly due to the rapid growth and cumulative magnitude of the disturbances to Earth's carbon cycle by the geologic extraction and burning of fossil carbon.  As of year 2014, fossil CO2 emitted as a theoretical 10 to 100 GtC pulse on top of the existing atmospheric concentration was expected to be 50% removed by land vegetation and ocean sinks in less than about a century, as based on the projections of coupled models referenced in the AR5 assessment. A substantial fraction (20-35%) was also projected to remain in the atmosphere for centuries to millennia, where fractional persistence increases with pulse size.
 Values are relative to year 1750.  AR6 reports the effective radiative forcing'' which includes effects of rapid adjustments in the atmosphere and at the surface.

Gases from IPCC Fourth Assessment Report
The following table has its sources in Chapter 2, p. 141, Table 2.1. of the IPCC Fourth Assessment Report, Climate Change 2007 (AR4), Working Group 1 Report, The Physical Science Basis.

Gases from IPCC Third Assessment Report
The following table has its sources in Chapter 6, p. 358, Table 6.1. of the IPCC Third Assessment Report, Climate Change 2001 (TAR), Working Group 1, The Scientific Basis.

Gases relevant to radiative forcing only

Gases relevant to radiative forcing and ozone depletion

See also
 List of refrigerants

References

Greenhouse gases
Climate forcing